Frederick Herbert Du Vernet (1860 – 22 October 1924) was the second Bishop of Caledonia and inaugural Metropolitan of British Columbia (taking the title Archbishop of Caledonia whilst Metropolitan.)

Du Vernet was educated at Wycliffe College, Toronto and ordained in 1883. After a curacy at St James the Apostle, Montreal he was Diocesan Missioner for the Diocese of Montreal then Professor of Practical Theology at his old college until 1895. From then until 1904 he was Rector of St John, Toronto when he was appointed to the episcopate. He became a Doctor of Divinity (DD).

References

1860 births
University of Toronto alumni
Anglican bishops of Caledonia
20th-century Anglican Church of Canada bishops
20th-century Anglican archbishops
Metropolitans of British Columbia
1924 deaths